Low Gap is an unincorporated community in Johnson County, Kentucky, United States. Low Gap's ZIP code is 41238.

References

Unincorporated communities in Johnson County, Kentucky
Unincorporated communities in Kentucky